The 2011 United States Mixed Doubles Curling Championship was held from December 9-12, 2010 at the Duluth Curling Club in Duluth, Minnesota. Brady Clark and Cristin Clark won the tournament, earning the right to represent the United States at the 2011 World Mixed Doubles Curling Championship in St. Paul, Minnesota.

Teams 
Twenty teams qualified to compete in the championship.

Round robin 

The 20 teams were split into three pools; each pool played a round robin and at the end the top two teams advanced to the playoffs.

Playoffs 

The playoffs consisted of a 6-team bracket with the top two teams directly in the semifinals. There was a two-loss provision included, such that a team was not eliminated until they had two losses in the tournament. Because the team of Clayton Orvik and Senja Lopac entered the playoffs undefeated, they were not eliminated when they lost to Courtney and Tyler George in the semifinals and instead got to challenge the winner of the first round of the championship, Brady and Cristin Clark, for the title.

Bracket

References 

United States National Curling Championships
Curling in Minnesota
2010 in curling
December 2010 sports events in the United States
Sports competitions in Duluth, Minnesota
2010 in sports in Minnesota
21st century in Duluth, Minnesota
United States